Yvonne Jacquette (born 1934) is an American painter and printmaker known in particular for her depictions of aerial landscapes, especially her low-altitude and oblique aerial views of cities or towns, often painted using a distinctive, pointillistic technique. She is currently represented by DC Moore Gallery, New York.

Biography
Jacquette grew up in Stamford, Connecticut and studied at the Rhode Island School of Design. 
She taught at Moore College of Art and was a visiting artist at the University of Pennsylvania from 1972 to 1976. She taught at Parsons School of Design from 1975 to 1978, and at the University of Pennsylvania from 1979 to 1984.

Her three-part mural "Autumn Expression" (1980) is in the U.S. Post Office in Bangor, Maine. According to the Smithsonian American Art Museum's online bio, Ms. Jacquette has held various academic positions and was also honored by the American Academy of Arts and Letters in 1990.

In an interview with art critic John Yau in The Brooklyn Rail, Jacquette says of the way she came to begin painting aerial views: 

She married Rudy Burckhardt. She is a visiting artist at the Siena Art Institute.
She lives in New York City.

Work 
As noted in The Female Gaze, "Jacquette's works begin with direct studies made with pastel on paper or photographs taken from airplanes, skyscrapers, or rented single-engine planes. She often took flights primarily to study cloud formations and aerial perspectives. She has been described as the 'Canaletto of the skies.' Her paintings are intensely colored, elaborately detailed panoramas of cities, and the countryside at various day and night. Unique vies and radical angles draw attention to the act of perception, anthropomorphizing the buildings that occupy her urbanscapes."

Awards and commissions
2009	
Eric Isenbeurger Annual Prize + Samuel F. B. Morse Medal, 184th Annual Exhibition of Contemporary American Art, National Academy Museum, New York, NY
2005	
Benjamin Altman Prize, National Academy Museum, New York, NY
2003
Inducted into the American Academy of Arts & Letters, New York, NY
1999	
Mikhail and Ekaterna Shatalov Prize, National Academy Museum, New York, NY
1998	
Andrew Carnegie Prize for Painting, National Academy Museum, New York, NY
1998-97
Guggenheim Foundation Grant for Painting
1994	
Print Commission, Business Committee for the Arts
1993	
Print Commission, Zimmerli Museum, Rutgers University, New Brunswick, NJ
1990
Painters Award, American Academy of Arts and Letters, New York
1988
Elected into the National Academy of Design
1979-82
Mural Commission, Federal Building and Post Office, Bangor, Maine, (G.S.A. Project)
1976	
Ingram Merrill Award for Painting

Solo exhibitions
2010
“Yvonne Jacquette, Aerials: Paintings, Prints, Pastels,” Center for Maine Contemporary Art, Rockport, ME
“Yvonne Jacquette,” DC Moore Gallery, New York, NY
2009-10
“Yvonne Jacquette: The Complete Woodcuts, 1987–2009,” Mary Ryan Gallery, New York, NY; Springfield Art Museum, Springfield, MO.
2008
“Picturing New York: Nocturnes by Yvonne Jacquette,” Museum of the City of New York, New York, NY
“Yvonne Jacquette,” DC Moore Gallery, New York, NY
2006	
“Yvonne Jacquette: Arrivals and Departures,” DC Moore Gallery, New York, NY
2005
“Yvonne Jacquette: Paintings and Works on Paper,” Springfield Art Museum, Springfield, MO
2003	
DC Moore Gallery, New York, NY
2002-03	
“Aerial Muse: The Art of Yvonne Jacquette,” Iris and B. Gerald Cantor Center for Visual Arts, Stanford University, CA; Colby College Museum of Art, Waterville, ME; Utah Museum of Fine Arts, Salt Lake City, UT; Hudson River Museum, Yonkers, NY
2000	
“Yvonne Jacquette - Evening: Chicago and New York,” DC Moore Gallery, New York, NY
1998
“Yvonne Jacquette: Maine Aerials,” Art Gallery, University of Southern Maine, Gorham, ME
“Paintings and Works on Paper by Yvonne Jacquette,” Hollins Art Gallery, Hollins College, Roanoke, VA
1997
“Yvonne Jacquette: Vantage on High,” DC Moore Gallery, New York, NY
1996	
“Yvonne Jacquette Frescoes,” Caldbeck Gallery, Rockland, ME
1995
“Yvonne Jacquette: Paintings and Pastels, 1992-1994,” Brooke Alexander, New York, NY
1992	
“Yvonne Jacquette: Frescoes, Monotypes, Pastels and Prints,” Brooke Alexander Gallery, New York, NY
1991	
“Yvonne Jacquette: Aerial Views, Rudy Burckhardt: Photographs,” Jewett Hall Gallery, The University of Maine at Augusta, Augusta, ME
“Yvonne Jacquette,” Elizabeth Galasso Fine Art Leasing, Ossining, NY
1990	
“Drawings and Monotypes,” O’Farrell Gallery, Brunswick, ME
“Paintings, Frescoes, Pastels 1988-1990,” John Berggruen Gallery, San Francisco, CA; Brooke Alexander, New York, NY
1988
“Looking Down: Prints by Yvonne Jacquette,” Joe and Emily Lowe Art Gallery, Syracuse University, Syracuse, NY
“Yvonne Jacquette: Paintings and Pastels: New York Triptychs,” Brooke Alexander, New York, NY
1986
“Yvonne Jacquette, Tokyo Nightviews,” Brooke Alexander, New York, NY; Bowdoin College Museum of Art, Brunswick, ME
“Yvonne Jacquette: Works on Paper,” Barbara Kraków Gallery, Boston, MA
1985
“Yvonne Jacquette,” Yurakucho Seibu/Takanawa Art, Tokyo, Japan
1984	
“Yvonne Jacquette: Recent Paintings and Works on Paper,” John Berggruen Gallery, San Francisco, CA
1983	
“Currents 22. Yvonne Jacquette: Recent Drawings and Pastels,” St. Louis Art Museum, St. Louis, MO
“Yvonne Jacquette: Drawings and Pastels 1982-83,” Brooke Alexander, New York, NY
1982
“Yvonne Jacquette: Paintings and Drawings,” Brooke Alexander, New York, NY
1981	
“Yvonne Jacquette: Paintings and Pastels,” Brooke Alexander, New York, NY
1979	
“Yvonne Jacquette: The Night Paintings,” Brooke Alexander, New York, NY
1976	
“Yvonne Jacquette: Paintings, Drawings and Monotypes,” Brooke Alexander, New York, NY
1974
“Yvonne Jacquette: 22nd Street,” Brooke Alexander, New York, NY
“Yvonne Jacquette: Paintings,” Fischbach Gallery, New York, NY
1972	
Tyler School of Art, Philadelphia, PA
Fischbach Gallery, New York, NY
1971
“Yvonne Jacquette: Recent Paintings,” Fischbach Gallery, New York, NY
1965	
Swarthmore College, Swarthmore, PA

Public collections

American Academy of Arts and Letters, New York, NY
Arkansas Arts Center, Little Rock, AR
Arnot Art Museum, Elmira, NY
Bowdoin College Museum of Art, Brunswick, ME
The Brooklyn Museum, Brooklyn, NY 
The Cleveland Museum of Art, Cleveland, OH
Colby College Museum of Art, Waterville, ME
The Columbus Museum of Art, Columbus, GA
The Columbus Museum of Art, Columbus, OH
Concordia College, Seward, NE
The Delaware Art Museum, Wilmington, DE
Farnsworth Museum & Library, Rockland, ME
Harn Museum of Art, University of Florida, Gainesville, FL
Herbert F. Johnson Museum of Art, Cornell University, Ithaca, NY
Hirshhorn Museum and Sculpture Garden, Washington, DC
Iris and B. Gerald Cantor Center for Visual Arts, Stanford University, Stanford, CA
Library of Congress, Washington, DC
The McNay Museum of Art, San Antonio, TX
The Metropolitan Museum of Art, New York, NY
Miami Art Museum, Miami, FL
Minneapolis Institute of Arts, Minneapolis, MN
Museum of Art, Carnegie Institute, Pittsburgh, PA
Museum of Fine Arts in Santa Fe, Lucy Lippard Collection, Santa Fe, NM
The Museum of Modern Art, New York, NY
Museum of the City of New York, New York, NY
New Orleans Museum of Art, New Orleans, LA
The New York Historical Society, New York, NY
North Carolina Museum of Art, Raleigh, NC
Ohio State University, Athens, OH
The Palmer Museum of Art at Penn State, University Park, PA
Pennsylvania Academy of the Fine Arts, Philadelphia, PA
Philadelphia Museum of Art, Philadelphia, PA
Rutgers University, New Brunswick, NJ
The Saint Louis Art Museum, Saint Louis, MO
Smithsonian American Art Museum
Springfield Art Museum, Spring Field, MO
Staatliche Museum, Berlin, Germany
University of Iowa Museum of Art, Iowa City, IA
Weatherspoon Art Gallery, Greensboro, NC
Whitney Museum of American Art, New York, NY
Wichita Art Museum, Wichita, KS
Yale University Art Gallery, New Haven, CT

See also
 Landscape art
 Aerial landscape art
 Cityscape

Sources 
 Davenport, Ray, "Davenport's Art Reference and Price Guide, Gold Edition" (Ventura, California, 2005) ; 
 Dreikausen, Margret, "Aerial Perception: The Earth as Seen from Aircraft and Spacecraft and Its Influence on Contemporary Art"  (Associated University Presses: Cranbury, NJ; London, England; Mississauga, Ontario: 1985) 
 Faberman, Hilarie,  "Aerial Muse : The Art of Yvonne Jacquette" (New York) : Hudson Hills Press ; Stanford, Calif. : In Association with Iris & B. Gerald Cantor Center for Visual Arts at Stanford University, 2002 
 Ratcliff, Carter, Yvonne Jacquette: Paintings, Frescoes, Pastels 1988-1990, New York, N.Y.: Brooke Alexander Gallery ; San Francisco : John Berggruen Gallery, 1990.  [exhibition catalogue]

References

Additional bibliography
Yvonne Jacquette: EveningL Chicago & New York, 2000 (exhibition catalogue) http://www.dcmooregallery.com/publications/yvonne-jacquette-evening-chicago-and-new-york-2000 DC Moore Gallery, 2000
Yvonne Jacquette: Arrivals and Departures, 2006 (exhibition catalogue) http://www.dcmooregallery.com/publications/yvonne-jacquette-arrivals-and-departures-2006 DC Moore Gallery, 2006
Yvonne Jacquette, 2010 (exhibition catalogue) http://www.dcmooregallery.com/publications/yvonne-jacquette-2010 DC Moore Gallery, 2010

External links
DC Moore Gallery: Yvonne Jacquette
 Askart.com page on Yvonne Jacquette
 Artcyclopedia.com page on Yvonne Jacquette
 Fine Arts Museums of San Francisco image base page on Yvonne Jacquette
Stewart & Stewart
The Brooklyn Rail, May 2006 "Yvonne Jacquette: Arrivals and Departures, DC Moore" http://images.dcmooregallery.com/www_dcmooregallery_com/Jacquette_THE_BROOKLYN_RAIL.jpg
The Brooklyn Rail, February 2008, "Yvonne Jacquette with John Yau" http://brooklynrail.org/2008/02/art/yvonne-jacquette-with-john-yau

1934 births
American women painters
Cityscape artists
American contemporary painters
Landscape artists
Living people
Members of the American Academy of Arts and Letters
Painters from Connecticut
Rhode Island School of Design alumni
Moore College of Art and Design faculty
University of Pennsylvania faculty
Parsons School of Design faculty
Date of birth missing (living people)
Artists from Stamford, Connecticut
Artists from Pittsburgh
Painters from Pennsylvania
American women printmakers
20th-century American painters
20th-century American women artists
20th-century American printmakers
21st-century American women artists
American women academics